Bihun goreng, bee hoon goreng or mee hoon goreng refers to a dish of fried noodles cooked with rice vermicelli in both the Indonesian and Malay languages. In certain countries, such as Singapore, the term goreng is occasionally substituted with its English equivalent for the name of the dish. 

There is no single defined recipe for the dish, and its composition and preparation varies greatly from household to household in all relevant cultural and linguistic regions, which may include vegetarian versions.

Variants

Indonesia
In Indonesian cuisine, bihun goreng is associated with Chinese Indonesian and Javanese cuisine. Like mie goreng or kwetiau goreng, bihun goreng is usually seasoned with sweet soy sauce and bumbu. Typical ingredients involved in its preparation include garlic, onion or shallots, fried prawn, chicken, beef, or sliced bakso (meatballs), chili, Chinese cabbage, cabbages, tomatoes, egg, and other vegetables. The dish may be accompanied with acar and garnished with fried shallots.

Malaysia
Noteworthy variants of the dish found in Malaysia include bihun goreng utara or Northern-style fried rice vermicelli, which refers to its prevalence in the northern region of Peninsular Malaysia. A popular breakfast food and snack, it is fried to a dry texture, and seasoned with chilli powder and chives.

Singapore
In Singapore, rice vermicelli is locally known and spelled as bee hoon, mee hoon, or mai fun. The dish is generally prepared mild without any spicy seasonings, and is a popular option for breakfast.

Gallery

See also

Kwetiau goreng
Mee goreng
Mee siam
Mie goreng
Pancit
Singapore-style noodles
Rice noodles
Rice vermicelli

References

Indonesian Chinese cuisine
Indonesian noodle dishes
Javanese cuisine
Malay cuisine
Malaysian cuisine
Singaporean cuisine
Street food in Indonesia
Fried noodles